Rosaria C. Fundanga is a Zambian politician.

Fundanga was a member of the National Assembly of Zambia for Chilubi. She is a member of the Patriotic Front.

References

Zambian politicians
Patriotic Front (Zambia) politicians
Living people
Year of birth missing (living people)
Place of birth missing (living people)
21st-century Zambian women politicians
21st-century Zambian politicians